Enrique Maier and Elizabeth Ryan were the defending champions, but lost in the quarterfinals to Gottfried von Cramm and Hilde Krahwinkel.

Von Cramm and Krahwinkel defeated Norman Farquharson and Mary Heeley in the final, 7–5, 8–6 to win the mixed doubles tennis title at the 1933 Wimbledon Championships.

Seeds

  Enrique Maier /  Elizabeth Ryan (quarterfinals)
  Jean Borotra /  Betty Nuthall (semifinals)
  Pat Hughes /  Helen Moody (quarterfinals)
  Norman Farquharson /  Mary Heeley (final)

Draw

Finals

Top half

Section 1

The nationality of Mrs G Hawkins is unknown.

Section 2

The nationalities of RG de Quetteville and Mrs HW Backhouse are unknown.

Section 3

Section 4

The nationality of GE Bean is unknown.

Bottom half

Section 5

Section 6

Section 7

Section 8

References

External links

X=Mixed Doubles
Wimbledon Championship by year – Mixed doubles